La Cité de la peur ( "The City of Fear"), also known as Le film de Les Nuls ("The Les Nuls Movie"), is a 1994 French comedy film written by and starring Chantal Lauby, Alain Chabat and Dominique Farrugia of the comedy group Les Nuls, and directed by Alain Berbérian in 1994.

The movie parodies big budget American films (Basic Instinct, Pretty Woman and The Terminator, among others, are directly spoofed) and relies heavily on puns and word play, which makes it somewhat inaccessible for non native French speakers.

Synopsis

Odile Deray (Lauby) is the publicist for the slasher movie Red is Dead, which features a serial killer whose weapons of choice are the hammer and sickle. She is invited to the Cannes film festival, where she is faced with the unanimous opinion that the movie is extremely bad. However, Red is Dead soon attracts the public attention when its projectionist is murdered by what seems to be a copycat of the movie's killer. Ecstatic, Odile brings the movie's intellectually disabled star Simon Jérémi (Farrugia) to the festival and hires bodyguard and self-proclaimed womanizer Serge Karamazov (Chabat) to protect them. One by one, all the projectionists assigned to the movie are murdered, keeping Red is Dead in the spotlight. Meanwhile, detective Patrick Bialès (Darmon) investigates on the murders and starts a romantic relationship with Odile.

Detailed plot

First day of the festival
The film opens with the last minutes of Red is Dead. In their bloody house, Sandy (de Fougerolles) and Ben (Farrugia) congratulate themselves on their defeat of Youri, the communist killer who murdered their entire family, and who is now lying on the floor, apparently dead.  Sandy goes to have a bath while Ben cleans the house in preparation for a dinner they have tonight. When Sandy comes out of the bathroom, she is attacked by a very alive Youri. Ben tries to protect her and accidentally kills her. He rushes out of the house and struggles to find the keys to open his convertible car. When he finally succeeds, the killer is only a few feet away from him. Ben, however, remembers with horror that he has forgotten to turn the vacuum cleaner off, and runs back to the house, knocking Youri into a conveniently placed petroleum puddle with the car door. After turning the vacuum cleaner off, he runs back to the car, where a phone call warns him that Youri is standing behind him. Ben fights Youri with his car phone, and manages to send him back into the puddle before setting it on fire. 
After Ben drives into the sunset, Youri triumphantly emerges from the puddle and the end credits roll.

In the theater, Odile Deray asks the viewers what they thought. Everybody leaves without a word, and she chases after a critic and pleads with him to write a favorable article. He refuses on the grounds that the movie is "utter crap". We learn that Odile is the publicist for the movie, and that today is the first day of the Cannes film festival. Odile visits the projectionist (Karyo) and briefly talks with him while he argues on the phone with his wife. After Odile leaves, the projectionist is murdered by a hammer and sickle wielding killer.

Second day of the festival
Odile is talking with the projectionist's widow (Lemercier). While the widow mourns her husband and reminisces their last argument, Odile realizes she can use the murder for publicity, and decides to bring the film's star to the festival, and to hire a bodyguard.

In a hotel room, a man watches the news on television. A deputy was murdered, and the main suspect is a politician called Jean-Paul Martoni. When the projectionist's murder is brought up, the man turns the TV off.

In Paris, Serge Karamazov unsuccessfully tries to talk his boss's secretary into letting him sleep with her. She ignores him and tells him to go in to talk to his boss. While playing various sports, Karamazov's boss reminds him that his job description does not include having sex with his clients, and instructs him to go to Cannes to protect Simon Jérémi, Red is Dead'''s main star. 
At the Nice airport, Karamazov meets Odile, and the two see Simon arrive, wielding a balloon and a nametag, and accompanied by a stewardess. Once in the car, Odile tells Simon of all the exciting things he is going to do in Cannes, prompting Simon to throw up. He explains that he throws up whenever he is really happy.
While Karamazov and Simon get to the Martinez hotel and are taken to their room, a second projectionist (Gélin) is murdered in the same fashion as the first one.

In the projection room, Odile discovers the body and calls the police. Commissaire Bialès soon arrives and is introduced by a short documentary movie about his life thus far. Simon and Karamazov arrive at the scene. Karamazov tells a police officer of his frustration at having to babysit Simon, and Simon, excited to see a Kinoton movie projector, throws up. Bialès wonders about the meaning of the letters found carved on the wall after both murders, an O and a D, and concludes that they spell "do", leading him to believe that the killer is a musician.

At the police headquarters, Odile is being interrogated in a scene parodying Basic Instinct (instead of smoking, Odile is eating sauerkraut). As Commissaire Bialès tells Odile of his suspicion that she planned the murders as a publicity stunt, another policeman comes in with a new piece of information: he found a piece of fabric on the scene of the crime. 
Back in the unnamed man's hotel room, the man is once again watching the news, and as he passes in front of a mirror, his face is revealed.

Third day of the festival
At the Martinez, Odile instructs Karamazov and Simon to hurry and get ready for the press conference, which starts in an hour. Upon realizing that Simon doesn't have anything to wear, Odile and Karamazov take him shopping in an obvious Pretty Woman parody.

Later, at the press conference, Odile scolds two women who are loudly gossiping, and the projection starts. 
Meanwhile, Karamazov is in the projection room to protect the projectionist (Bacri) against the killer. Karamazov, however, has food poisoning, and is passing foul gas, which prompts the projectionist to send him away to the bathroom. On his way, Karamazov meets an old flame, and they make awkward small talk. In the projection room, the projectionist is murdered. 
Karamazov sees the killer run away, and chases after him. However, he is stopped by a group of mimes protesting against sound films, and the killer gets away.

Fourth day of the festival
Odile is making preparations for the next projection, while Karamazov demonstrates his new hi-tech metal detector and Simon tries on outfits. Everybody gathers around the TV when a report about Red is Dead is shown on the news. It features an interview of Odile and Simon at a party held in the honour of the murdered projectionists, during which Simon, once again, throws up.

Later, at the Martinez, Odile meets Bialès for dinner. Odile talks about her life before Red is Dead, and as sexual tension quickly builds up between the two, they leave for Bialès's apartment. 
At a night club, Simon finds Karamazov completely drunk and ranting about his inability to seduce Odile. 
Meanwhile, at Bialès's apartment, the two have just had sex, and Odile accidentally discovers the killer's costume in a wardrobe. Horrified, she rushes to the night club, where she finds Karamazov enthusiastically insulting her.

The next scene starts with a disclaimer stating that, because of budgetary limits, it will be entirely dubbed by the crew, including sound effects. Amidst arguments and chit chat by the dubbers, the fourth projectionist (Mitchell) is killed, and the killer accidentally cuts his own finger. Another disclaimer then informs the viewer that the dubbed scene is over.

Fifth and last day of the festival
At the hotel's restaurant, Odile is briefing Simon about his scheduled interviews. Karamazov arrives, and Odile tells him she has found the next projectionist, who will be joining them. They argue about Karamazov's behaviour in the night club, and Odile reveals that she thinks Bialès is the murderer. Karamazov muses about the letters left by the killer: they are now O, D, I and L. Karamazov wonders if it spells Lido, and theorizes that the killer may be a cabaret dancer. He then proceeds to explain that the murderer is probably a serial killer, and that he has designed a giant mousetrap to catch him.

His explanations are interrupted by the arrival of the new projectionist, the unnamed man who was seen watching the news all throughout the movie: it's Émile Gravier (Karmann), an old friend of Odile's. The camera dramatically zooms on Émile's finger, which is wrapped in a bandage. 
Odile and Émile reminisce about their youth, the latter much more enthusiastically than the former.

Later, the awards ceremony is about to start, and Odile, Karamazov, Simon and Émile are in a Limousine, getting ready to climb the famous stairs to the Palais des festivals. Odile offers Émile chewing gum, which prompts him to remember, in a flashback, the way Odile always neglected him for her boyfriends, while he was secretly in love with her. 
The four get out of the car and make their way up the stairs. Suddenly, Jean-Paul Martoni, who has been convicted of the deputy's murder, arrives and, threatening the crowd with a gun, runs into the building. Émile, under enormous stress, passes out.

Once inside, Odile panics about Émile's unconsciousness, which leaves her with no projectionist. Simon reveals that he can project Red is Dead'', having been trained as a projectionist, and adds "because, you see, I'm not really an actor!". 
While Simon prepares to start projecting the movie, the crowd is getting impatient. Odile instructs Karamazov to distract them, and he and Bialès launch in an "improvised" musical number about the Carioca, which the public loves. 
The movie starts playing, and they get off the stage. Bialès is reminded of Martoni's presence inside the building, and goes after him.

In the projection room, Simon is attacked by Émile, who reveals that he killed all the previous projectionists in an attempt to get Odile's attention. After Simon offers Émile some chewing gum, the two struggle and knock the projector around.
In the theater, Odile is horrified to notice that the wrong reel has been launched, and instructs Karamazov to go check on Simon. Karamazov finds Émile and Simon in a struggle, and exclaims "Simon, so it was you all along! I knew it!", letting Émile escape. A frustrated Simon explains that Émile is the killer.

Simon and Karamazov chase after Émile, only to discover him caught in Karamazov's giant mouse trap. Odile and Bialès arrive and learn the killer's identity. Odile inquires about the costume she found in Bialès's apartment, but his explanation is covered by loud music. The two reconcile, but suddenly, Martoni storms in and takes Odile hostage. After shooting Bialès in the knee, Martoni is knocked out by Émile, who managed to get out of the trap. Émile starts to explain himself, but is shot by Martoni. As he lays dying, Odile offers him chewing gum.

Martoni is arrested and Bialès is carried away on a gurney; he reassures Odile that he will be able to walk again, but she tells him she is only worried about her movie. 
Outside, Karamazov once again wonders about the letters, O, D, I, L. 
Odile, Simon and Karamazov walk away. When Simon says that he is hungry and would be happy to eat Chinese, Karamazov and Odile agree to go to an Italian restaurant.

Cast
Alain Chabat as Serge Karamazov, Yuri, and a journalist
Dominique Farrugia as Simon Jérémi (a.k.a. Ben, in Red is Dead)
Chantal Lauby as Odile Deray
Gérard Darmon as Patrick Bialès (and his parents, Maurice Bialès and Alicia Lampéro)
Sam Karmann as Émile Gravier
Patrick Lizana as Grimaldi
Jean-Christophe Bouvet as Jean-Paul Martoni
Éric Prat as Garcia
Artus de Penguern as Sens
Marc de Jonge as Le patron de Karamazov
Hélène de Fougerolles as Sandy Brookshield (a.k.a. Sandy, in Red is Dead)
Valérie Lemercier as the widow of the first projectionist
Tchéky Karyo as the first projectionist
Daniel Gélin as the second projectionist
Jean-Pierre Bacri as the third projectionist
Eddy Mitchell as the fourth projectionist
Dominique Besnehard as the journalist
Sophie Mounicot as the journalist
A number of celebrities make cameo appearances as themselves, including  Rosanna Arquette, Dave, Pierre Lescure, Daniel Toscan du Plantier and Patrice Laffont.

Reception
The film was number one at the French box office for two weeks.

References

External links
 
 
 
 

1994 films
1990s parody films
Films about films
Films directed by Alain Berbérian
Films set in Cannes
French comedy films
1990s French-language films
French parody films
1990s serial killer films
1994 comedy films
1990s French films